Robert Morris Morgenthau (July 31, 1919July 21, 2019) was an American lawyer. From 1975 until his retirement in 2009, he was the District Attorney for New York County (the borough of Manhattan), having previously served as United States Attorney for the Southern District of New York throughout much of the 1960s on the appointment of John F. Kennedy. At retirement, Morgenthau was the longest-serving district attorney in the history of the State of New York.

Early life
Morgenthau was born in 1919 in New York City into a prominent Ashkenazi Jewish family that had emigrated from Baden in 1866. He was the son of Elinor (née Fatman) and Henry Morgenthau Jr., who served as the Secretary of the Treasury under Presidents Franklin Delano Roosevelt and Harry Truman from 1934 until 1945.  His maternal great-grandfather was Mayer Lehman, a co-founder of Lehman Brothers. His grandfather, Henry Morgenthau Sr., was United States Ambassador to the Ottoman Empire during World War I. Before going into diplomatic service, Henry Morgenthau Sr. had made a fortune in real estate, and became a strong financial backer of Democratic President Woodrow Wilson. 
Morgenthau's paternal grandmother was born in Montgomery, Alabama.

From the his earliest days, the Morgenthau family was well-connected politically. The family home was near Franklin Delano Roosevelt's Springwood Estate at Hyde Park, New York, and he grew up acquainted with the future President.

After graduating from the New Lincoln School, Deerfield Academy, and Amherst College, Morgenthau commissioned in the United States Navy, serving for four and a half years during World War II. He attained the rank of lieutenant commander, and served as the executive officer of both the USS Lansdale and the USS Harry F. Bauer. Naval records indicate heroic action during the Battle of Iwo Jima — the Bauer was attacked by thirteen kamikazes, and survived a torpedo and dive bomber attack (both failed to detonate). He saw action in both the Mediterranean and Pacific theaters, mostly aboard destroyers.

After the war, Morgenthau studied law, graduating from Yale Law School in 1948. He joined the New York law firm of Patterson, Belknap & Webb, becoming a partner in 1954.

Career

U.S. Attorney
 
In 1961, after twelve years of practicing corporate law, Morgenthau accepted an appointment from President John F. Kennedy as United States Attorney for the Southern District of New York. In 1962, he was the Democratic nominee for Governor of New York, and resigned his federal office. After his defeat by the incumbent Governor Nelson Rockefeller, Morgenthau was reappointed U.S. Attorney and served in that position for the remainder of the Kennedy and Johnson administrations.

In January 1969, following the election of President Richard Nixon, Morgenthau remained in office, and for months resisted increasingly public pressures from the Nixon Administration to resign. He retained support from New York's liberal Republican U.S. Senators Jacob K. Javits and Charles Goodell. Morgenthau and his supporters claimed that replacing him would disrupt his work on vital cases, and that Nixon might be seeking to prevent Morgenthau from pursuing investigations that would prove embarrassing to the President or his friends. Nonetheless, Morgenthau's position became increasingly untenable. While well-regarded, he was after all a Democrat, thought to harbor political aspirations. Morgenthau's insistence on remaining in office seemed increasingly unreasonable. He was eventually forced out of office at the end of 1969. Republican Whitney North Seymour Jr. was appointed as U.S. Attorney for the Southern District of New York.

Return to politics
Afterward, Morgenthau served briefly in the reformist administration of Mayor John V. Lindsay as a deputy mayor, before resigning to seek the Democratic nomination for governor in 1970. Morgenthau was less successful in raising funds and developing support than were two other candidates, Arthur Goldberg and Howard Samuels, and within weeks, he withdrew from the race. Goldberg won the nomination, and was subsequently defeated by Rockefeller.

District Attorney of New York County
Morgenthau remained in private life until 1974, when he was elected to the office of District Attorney of New York County. This was a special election caused by the death of Frank Hogan, who had served as DA for more than 30 years. Morgenthau defeated Hogan's interim successor, Richard Kuh. He was elected to a full term in 1977, and was re-elected seven times. He was not opposed in a general election from 1985 to 2005.

Morgenthau was criticized in the press for his conduct in the wake of a major police corruption scandal. Eight men who were falsely arrested by New York City Transit Police officers in the scandal that shook the department were awarded more than $1 million in damages by a federal judge. One plaintiff, Ronald Yeadon, was a police officer. He was arrested twice while off duty and accused of sexually abusing a woman.

Morgenthau retained a national profile while serving in what was technically a local office, in part because of his dogged pursuit of white-collar crime. According to Gary Naftalis, a prominent Manhattan defense attorney who had been an assistant to Morgenthau in the 1960s, Morgenthau believed that prosecuting "crime in the suites" was every bit as important as prosecuting "crime in the streets".

At age 85 in 2005, Morgenthau announced that he would run for a ninth (eighth full) term as district attorney. For the first time in decades, he encountered a vigorous primary opponent – former state court judge Leslie Crocker Snyder.
Snyder won the endorsement of The New York Times, which, like virtually all of the city's establishment, had long supported Morgenthau.

Morgenthau won the Democratic primary with 59% of the vote, to Snyder's 41%. In the general election, he was once again the candidate for all political parties in the election, having been nominated by the Democrats, Republicans, and the Working Families Party. Morgenthau won re-election with more than 99% of the vote.

Retirement

On February 27, 2009, Morgenthau announced that he would not seek re-election in 2009, saying: "I never expected to be here this long ... [R]ecently, I figured that I'd served 25 years beyond the normal retirement age." He was succeeded in office by Cyrus Vance Jr., a prosecutor under Morgenthau and the son of former President Jimmy Carter's secretary of state Cyrus Vance. Morgenthau officially endorsed Vance on June 25. Vance went on to win the primary election on September 15, 2009 and the subsequent general election on November 3. On January 20, 2010, Morgenthau joined the law firm Wachtell, Lipton, Rosen & Katz.

Selected cases
Cases which Morgenthau's office prosecuted include:
Mark David Chapman (1981): Chapman pleaded guilty to second-degree murder in the killing of John Lennon and was sentenced to 20-years-to-life in prison. He has been denied parole multiple times and will likely never get out of jail.
Bernhard Goetz, the "Subway Vigilante" (1987): Charged with attempted murder, assault, reckless endangerment and several gun law violations after he shot four black teenagers who he felt were trying to rob him in 1984.
Robert Chambers, the "Preppie Killer" (1988): Chambers pleaded guilty to manslaughter in the killing of 18-year-old Jennifer Levin while the jury had the case and served 15 years in prison.
Central Park Jogger case (1989): Five teenaged suspects were wrongly convicted of assaulting and raping 28-year-old Trisha Meili in a "wilding" incident in the north section of Central Park. After Morgenthau's office investigated the confession in 2002 by another man, including finding that his DNA matched evidence at the scene, he recommended vacating the convictions of the five men and dismissal of charges, which the court accomplished.
Dennis Kozlowski and Mark Swartz (2005): The top two executives of Tyco were found guilty of stealing more than $150 million from the company they had been entrusted to manage.
Tupac Shakur (1994), he was convicted in New York City of three charges of sexual molestation, and served nine months in prison.

Selected assistant district attorneys under Morgenthau
Sonia Sotomayor (1979–1984): Current Associate Justice of the Supreme Court of the United States
Eliot Spitzer (1986–1992): Former Governor and Attorney General of New York State
Andrew Cuomo (1984–1985): Former Governor of New York, previously served as New York State Attorney General, and as Secretary of Housing and Urban Development under President Bill Clinton
Lanny A. Breuer (1985–1989): Former head of the Criminal Division of the Department of Justice
John F. Kennedy Jr. (1989–1993): Son of President John F. Kennedy and Jacqueline Kennedy, journalist, lawyer, and socialite
Robert F. Kennedy Jr. (1982–1983): Third child of Senator Robert F. Kennedy and Ethel Kennedy
Linda Fairstein (1976–2002): Former head of the Sex Crimes Unit, and current author of crime novels
Cyrus Vance Jr. (1982–1988): Former New York County District Attorney, son of Cyrus Vance, who was the Deputy Secretary of Defense under President Lyndon B. Johnson and Secretary of State under President Jimmy Carter
Jennifer Choe-Groves (1994-1997): Current Article III Judge, U.S. Court of International Trade

Television character
The character of District Attorney Adam Schiff (played by actor Steven Hill), the New York district attorney in the long-running TV series Law & Order, was loosely based on Morgenthau. Morgenthau reportedly was a fan of the character.

Affiliations
Morgenthau's other principal civic activities were the Police Athletic League of New York City, which he served since 1962, first as president and then chairman, and the Museum of Jewish Heritage, of which he was chairman.

Awards
In 2005, Morgenthau received The Hundred Year Association of New York's Gold Medal "in recognition of outstanding contributions to the City of New York". Morgenthau also received the Association Medal of the New York City Bar Association for exceptional contributions to the honor and standing of the bar in the city of New York.

In 2016 he received the Leo Baeck Medal.

Personal life
His first wife was Martha Pattridge, a Christian, whom he met in college; they had five children: Joan Morgenthau Wadsworth, Anne Pattridge Morgenthau Grand, Robert Pattridge Morgenthau, Elinor Gates Morgenthau, and Barbara Elizabeth Morgenthau Lee. They raised their children in the Jewish faith. Martha died in 1972. Morgenthau was devastated by her death, and for a while afterward, he refused to talk about her in order to avoid memories of her death.

In 1977, he married Lucinda Franks, an author who in 1971 won a Pulitzer Prize for National Reporting. She was also Christian. They had two children: Joshua Franks Morgenthau (born 1984), and Amy Elinor Morgenthau (born 1990). They lived in New York City. They remained married until his death and Franks survived him until she died on May 5, 2021. His son Joshua runs the family farm, Fishkill Farms, founded by Henry Morgenthau Jr.

Death
Morgenthau died at Lenox Hill Hospital in Manhattan on July 21, 2019 after a short illness. He was ten days shy of his 100th birthday.

References

External links

1919 births
2019 deaths
Lawyers from New York City
Military personnel from New York City
Jewish American military personnel
American people of German-Jewish descent
American Ashkenazi Jews
Jewish American people in New York (state) politics
United States Attorneys for the Southern District of New York
New York (state) Democrats
New York (state) lawyers
New York County District Attorneys
Amherst College alumni
Deerfield Academy alumni
Ethical Culture Fieldston School alumni
Yale Law School alumni
Patterson Belknap Webb & Tyler people
Wachtell, Lipton, Rosen & Katz people
United States Navy officers
United States Navy personnel of World War II
Corporate lawyers
Lehman family
Robert M.